RAL is a colour management system used in Europe that is created and administrated by the German  (RAL non-profit LLC), which is a subsidiary of the German . In colloquial speech, RAL refers to the RAL Classic system, mainly used for varnish and powder coating, but now plastics as well. Approved RAL products are provided with a hologram to make unauthorised versions difficult to produce. Imitations may show different hue and colour when observed under various light sources.

RAL colour space system

RAL Classic
In 1927, the German group  (National Committee for Delivery and Quality Assurance) invented a collection of forty colours under the name of "RAL 840".  Prior to that date, manufacturers and customers had to exchange samples to describe a tint, whereas from then on they would rely on numbers.

In the 1930s, the numbers were changed uniformly to four digits and the collection was renamed to "RAL 840 R" (R for revised).
Around 1940, the RAL colours were changed to the four-digit system, as is customary. Army camouflage colours were always recognized by a "7" or "8" in the first place until 1944. 
With tints constantly added to the collection, it was revised again in 1961 and changed to "RAL 840-HR", which consists of 210 colours and is in use to this day. In the 1960s, the colours were given supplemental names to avoid confusion in case of transposed digits. At the international furnishing fair imm Cologne, 13-19 January 2020, two new colours were presented in the Classic Collection: RAL 2017 RAL Orange and RAL 9012 Clean Room White.

"RAL 840-HR" covered only matte paint, so the 1980s saw the invention of "RAL 841-GL" for glossy surfaces, limited to 193 colours. A main criterion for colours in the RAL Classic collection is to be of "paramount interest". Therefore, most of the colours in it are used on warning and traffic signs or are dedicated to government agencies and public services (for example: RAL 1004 - Swiss Postal Service, RAL 1021 - Austrian Postal Service, RAL 1032 - German Postal Service). The first digit relates to the shade of the colour:

RAL F9
This collection, which follows the naming of RAL Classic, was invented in 1984.

RAL Design
In 1993 a new colour matching system was introduced, tailored to the needs of architects, designers and advertisers. It started with 1,688 colours and was revised to 1,625 colours and again to 1,825 colours. The colours of RAL Classic and RAL Design do not intersect.

Contrary to the preceding systems, RAL Design features no names and its numbering follows a scheme based on the CIELAB colour space, specifically cylindrical CIEHLC. Each colour is represented by seven digits, grouped in a triple and two pairs, representing hue (000–360 degrees, angle in the CIELab colour wheel), lightness (same as in L*a*b*) and chroma (relative saturation). The three numeric components of almost all RAL Design colours are multiples of 5, the majority are divisible by 10.

 Conversion from RAL Design number tuple to CIELAB
 

 "RAL 210 50 15" converts to L* = 50, a* = −12.99, b* = −7.5, for instance.

RAL Effect
RAL Effect comprises 420 solid colours and seventy metallic colours. It is the first collection from RAL to be based on waterborne paint systems.

RAL Digital
RAL Digital is software that allows designers to navigate the RAL colour space.

See also
 Colour chart, other colour systems and charts
 Federal Standard 595
 Natural Colour System
 Pantone

References

External links 
 Official website

 
Color space
Standards of Germany
1927 in the arts
1927 introductions
Color organizations
Color schemes
Construction standards
German inventions